is a Japanese politician of the Liberal Democratic Party, a member of the House of Representatives in the Diet (national legislature). A native of Hitachi, Ibaraki and graduate of Keio University, he was elected to the assembly of Tochigi Prefecture in 2003 and then to the House of Representatives for the first time in 2005.

References

External links 
 Official website in Japanese.

1959 births
Living people
People from Hitachi, Ibaraki
Keio University alumni
University of Denver alumni
Koizumi Children
Members of the House of Representatives (Japan)
Liberal Democratic Party (Japan) politicians